Haji Sakhi was selected to represent Kunar Province in Afghanistan's Meshrano Jirga, the upper house of its National Legislature, in 2005.
A report on Kunar prepared at the Navy Postgraduate School stated that he was "affiliated with Sedaqat".
It states he was a college graduate, who sat on the 
Economics Committee.

References

Politicians of Kunar Province
Living people
Members of the House of Elders (Afghanistan)
Year of birth missing (living people)